Garrett Brown (born April 6, 1942) is an American inventor, best known as the creator of the Steadicam. Brown's invention allows camera operators to film while walking without the normal shaking and jostles of a handheld camera. The Steadicam was first used in the Hal Ashby film Bound for Glory (1976), receiving an Academy Award (Best Cinematography), and since used on such films as Rocky, filming Rocky's running and training sequences, and Return of the Jedi, where Brown walked through a Redwood forest with the Steadicam shooting film at 1 frame per second to achieve the illusion of high speed motion during the speeder-bike chase.

The sequence in Rocky that took the audience up what would later be known as the Rocky Steps of the Philadelphia Museum of Art for the triumphant moment at the top was first filmed during tests for the original Steadicam system.
The system was used extensively on Stanley Kubrick's 1980 classic horror film The Shining, starring Jack Nicholson. Brown's Steadicam work can be seen in over seventy motion pictures.

Brown has also invented the SkyCam (for football games), DiveCam (following olympic divers) and MobyCam (underwater camera following olympic swimmers).

Garrett Brown is the father of Jonathan Brown, also a professional cinematographer. Both worked together as Steadicam operators on the film Bulworth, directed by and starring Warren Beatty. A member of the American Society of Cinematographers and the Directors Guild of America, Garrett Brown was recipient of an Oscar for Scientific or Technical Achievement from the Academy of Motion Picture Arts and Sciences and an Emmy Award from the National Academy of Television Arts and Sciences for his invention of the Steadicam.

Early years

After his graduation from Haverford High School, he matriculated at Tufts University, where he met Al Dana.  Together, they formed the folk duo Brown & Dana, and recorded the classic "It Was a Very Good Year", among others.
Brown also attained a cult following for his radio advertisements with Anne Winn, especially for Molson Golden beer. Their witty repartee became a template for others.

Inventions
Garrett Brown has invented multiple camera supports focusing mostly on camera stabilization.

 Equipois: A mechanical arm for heavy equipment.
 FlyCam: A closed loop, stabilized tracking camera system.
 DiveCam: The first dropping vertical camera system.
 GoCam: The ultra-light high speed camera tracking system.
 MobyCam: The first submarine tracking camera system.
 SkyCam: The first suspended flying camera system.
 Steadicam: The original handheld stabilizing system.
 Steadicam Merlin: Next generation hand held Steadicam system.
 Steadicam Tango: A new Steadicam accessory for floor-to-ceiling boom range.
 SuperFlyCam: An ultralight stabilized 35mm wire-borne flying camera.
 Zeen: Elevating walker.

Awards and recognitions

 2013 – Joined the National Inventors Hall of Fame for his "Equipment for Use with Hand Held Motion Picture Cameras" Patent No. 4,017,168 the Steadicam® Camera Stabilizer.
 2012 – Steadicam Guild Life Achievement Award.

Academy Award 
 2006 – Scientific and Engineering Award – For the original concept of the Skycam flying camera system - the first use of 3D volumetric cable technology for motion picture cinematography.
 2001 – American Society of Cinematographers – President's Award
 1999 – Technical Achievement Award – Shared with: Jerry Holway For the creation of the Skyman flying platform for Steadicam operators.
 1978 – Academy Award of Merit – (The Cinema Products Corporation. Engineering Staff under the supervision of John Jurgens). For the invention and development of Steadicam.

Society of Camera Operators 
 2008 – Technical Achievement Award Shared with: Jerry Holway (inventor) (The Tiffen Company [us] (developer) ). For the Ultra2 Steadicam camera support system.
 1998 – Historical Shot for: Bound for Glory (1976). 
 1992 – Technical achievement award Shared with: Ed Di Giulio (ceo Cinema Products) (Cinema Products (developer) ). For the Steadicam camera stabilizing system.

Nikola Tesla Satellite Award 
 2014 – For visionary achievement in filmmaking technology

References

External links
 
 Homepage of Steadicam inventor Garrett Brown
 Steadicam Operators Association
 Interview in Knowledge@Wharton published February 2006
 Interview of Garett Brown on NPR: "Steadicam Creator Joins Inventors Hall of Fame"
 Meet the 2013 National Inventors Hall of Fame Inductees
 Folk singing duo with Garrett Brown
 e.g Conference
 

American cinematographers
Living people
20th-century American inventors
Academy Award for Technical Achievement winners
1942 births
Recipients of the Scientific and Technical Academy Award of Merit
Primetime Emmy Engineering Award winners